John Godfrey Saxe I (June 2, 1816 – March 31, 1869) was an American poet known for his re-telling of the Indian parable "The Blind Men and the Elephant", which introduced the story to a western audience.

Biography
Saxe was born in 1816 in Highgate, Vermont, at Saxe's Mills, where his settler grandfather, John Saxe (Johannes Sachse), a German immigrant and Loyalist to the Crown, built the area's first gristmill in 1786. Saxe was the son of Peter Saxe, miller, judge and periodic member of the Vermont House of Representatives; and Elizabeth Jewett of Weybridge, Vermont. The poet was named for two of his paternal uncles, John and Godfrey, who had died as young men before his birth. Raised in a strict Methodist home, Saxe was first sent, in 1835, to Wesleyan University which he left after a year, and then to Middlebury College, from which he graduated in 1839.

In 1841 he married Sophia Newell Sollace, a sister of a Middlebury classmate, with whom he had six children including John Theodore Saxe.

He was admitted to the Vermont bar in 1843 and tried to run a business with his dutiful and pious older brother, Charles Jewett Saxe. For some years he practiced successfully in Franklin County. In 1850-51 he served as state's attorney for Chittenden County.

The words "dutiful" and "pious" never applied to the satirist. Bored by his legal work, Saxe began publishing poems for The Knickerbocker, of which "The Rhyme of the Rail" is his most famous early work. He soon caught the attention of the prominent Boston publishing house Ticknor and Fields. Though he received no royalties for his first volume, it ran to ten reprintings. He became a solid performer for Ticknor & Fields, though his sales ranked far behind his friend, Henry Wadsworth Longfellow. His poem "The Puzzled Census-Taker" amused many, and "Rhyme of the Rail" was possibly the most admired poem of the period about rail travel. Saxe was editor of the Sentinel in Burlington, Vermont, from 1850 to 1856.

Saxe became a sought after speaker, toured frequently and stayed prolific throughout the 1850s. In 1859 and 1860 he ran unsuccessfully for governor of Vermont. As a northern Democrat, he advocated a non-interference policy on slavery and supported Illinois Senator Douglas's policy of "popular sovereignty", a position which rendered the poet extremely unpopular in Republican Vermont. After his second, and even more punishing electoral defeat, Saxe left his home state in 1861 for Albany, New York. Convinced extremists on both sides had pushed the nation into a fratricidal war, he composed "The Blind Man and The Elephant", his most famous poem. Mr. Saxe never fully embraced abolition, opposed the enfranchisement of black voters, and became a critic of the Federal policy on Reconstruction.  He was one of the featured speakers at a mass rally in Manhattan in September 1866 opposing Reconstruction. His views clashed with those of his older brother, who had served in the New York Assembly as "War Democrat."

Saxe spent his summers in Saratoga, contributed articles for the Albany Evening Journal and Albany Morning Argus, and published poems in Harper's, The Atlantic, and The Ledger, and remained popular on the lecture circuit. "The Proud Miss McBride" and "Song of Saratoga" were some of famous works in this period. However, his attempts to re-enter politics remained unsuccessful.
 
Always mercurial, Saxe became more erratic following the death of his oldest brother in 1867. He was not temperamentally suited to assume the role of head of the family. Instead the poet's son, John Theodore Saxe, took the reins of his brother's lumber firm and managed the family's finances. The 1870s, while living in Carroll Gardens, Brooklyn, a series of woes befell Saxe. His youngest daughter died of tuberculosis. In 1875, he suffered head injuries in a rail accident near Wheeling, West Virginia, from which he never fully recovered, and then over the next several years his two other daughters, his eldest son, and daughter-in-law also died of tuberculosis. In 1879, his wife burst a blood vessel in her brain and collapsed and died. Including a young son who died in the 1840s, Mr. Saxe had buried five of his six children as well as his wife.

Mr. Saxe sank deep into depression and spent his final years in Albany to live with his last surviving child, Charles Gordon Saxe. His decline from the rollicking poet to grieving recluse earned the sympathy of the people of Albany, and when he died in 1887, the New York State Assembly ordered his likeness to be chiseled into the "poet's corner" of the Great Western Staircase in the New York State Capitol.

Legacy

His best remembered poem "The Blind Men and the Elephant", a version of the ancient tale Blind men and an elephant, was not his most famous in his day. Though a satirist, his poems written during more somber periods remain some of his most beautiful and enduring, including "Little Jerry the Miller" about his father's mill assistant. Few of the satirical works which had made him famous are read today.

The poet's orphaned grandson, John Godfrey Saxe II, became a New York state senator, President of the New York Bar, and counsel of Columbia University.

According to Fred R. Shapiro, author of the Yale Book of Quotations, The Daily Cleveland Herald in its issue of March 29, 1869, quotes Saxe as saying, "Laws, like sausages, cease to inspire respect in proportion as we know how they are made."

Partial bibliography
 The Poems of John Godfrey Saxe (many editions)
  Progress : a satire (1847)
 Table Rock Album and Sketches Of the Falls and Scenery Adjacent (1848)
 The proud Miss MacBride,: a legend of Gotham (1850)
 The money-king and other poems (1859)
 Clever stories of many nations, rendered in rhyme (1855)
 The Masquerade and other poems (1866)
 Leisure-Day Rhymes (1875)
 The poetical works of John Godfrey Saxe: Household Edition: with illustrations (1889)

See also

Blind men and an elephant
Elephant test
John Godfrey Saxe II

References

External links

 
 
 
 Laws, like sausages, cease to inspire respect in ... - Barry Popik
Guide to the John Godfrey Saxe Collection 1857-1875 at the University of Chicago Special Collections Research Center

19th-century American poets
American humorous poets
American male poets
American people of German descent
Wesleyan University alumni
Middlebury College alumni
1816 births
1887 deaths
People from Highgate, Vermont
19th-century American male writers
Vermont lawyers
State's attorneys in Vermont
People from Carroll Gardens, Brooklyn
19th-century American lawyers
Burials at Green-Wood Cemetery